Nadine Bernadette Neumann (born 3 December 1975) is an Australian former breaststroke swimmer.

She overcame chronic fatigue syndrome at the age of 15, and was denied an Olympic birth in Barcelona because of a broken neck. She competed for Australia at the 1996 Summer Olympics in Atlanta, where she finished in sixth position, clocking 2:28.34 in the final of the 200-metre breaststroke. She captained the Australian Swimming Team at the 1998 Commonwealth Games and 1999 Pan Pacific Championships, competing in the 400-metre Individual Medley, 200-metre Butterfly and 800-metre Freestyle events as well as the breaststroke.

Upon retiring from competitive swimming, Neumann was a  motivational speaker and worked in public relations and marketing, before becoming a high school teacher.

Neumann's memoir, Wobbles – An Olympic Story, won the 2009 IP Picks Award for Best Creative Non-Fiction and was published the same year. She has published a number of other short pieces and news articles and is currently working on a series of picture books, a middle-grade fantasy novel, and an historical fiction novel based on the lives of her two grandmothers.

She lives with her husband and four young children in the Hunter Valley, NSW.

References

External links
 Australian Olympic Committee

1975 births
Living people
Australian people of German descent
People with chronic fatigue syndrome
Sportswomen from New South Wales
Australian female breaststroke swimmers
Australian female butterfly swimmers
Australian female freestyle swimmers
Australian female medley swimmers
Olympic swimmers of Australia
Swimmers at the 1996 Summer Olympics
Swimmers from Sydney
Universiade medalists in swimming
Universiade silver medalists for Australia
Universiade bronze medalists for Australia
Medalists at the 1995 Summer Universiade
20th-century Australian women